Driomenia is a genus of solenogasters, a kind of shell-less, worm-like mollusk.

Species
 Driomenia pacifica Heath, 1911

References

 Heath H. (1911). Reports on the scientific results of the expedition to the Tropical Pacific, in charge of Alexander Agassiz, by the U. S. Fish Commission Steamer Albatross, from August 1899 to June 1900, Commander Jefferson F. Moser. XVI. The Solenogastress. Memoirs of the Museum of Comparative Zoölogy at Harvard College 45: 1-182 pl. 1-40

Solenogastres